Mainz-Mombach station is one of two railway stations in the suburb of Mombach of the German town of Mainz. Due to its central location it is the primary station of the suburb besides the halt “Waggonfabrik”. The station is a part of the West Rhine Railway and borders the Wye: Gleisdreieck Mainz, leading to the Kaiserbrücke (Mainz) and the main station Mainz.

It is served by Mittelrheinbahn electrified standard gauge trains. Long-distance trains call at the central station, Mainz Hauptbahnhof.

Six rail tracks run into the train station with a central island platform. Due to the geography of the village, the station is entered on street level, one level below the elevated platform, with trains entering on the embankment. A tiled passenger tunnel leads to the platform. The goods station is located nearby as an independent facility not directly connected with the passenger station. The goods station lost its role as a hub, when the local goods function was drastically reduced. The goods sheds are still used for storing goods as depots of road freight companies that replaced the railway.

References

Mombach